Samuel Willard Beakes (January 11, 1861 – February 9, 1927) was a politician from the U.S. state of Michigan.

Life and career
Beakes was born in Sullivan County, New York to parents Elizabeth Bull and George M. Beakes. He attended Wallkill Academy in Middletown, New York. Beakes graduated from the law department of the University of Michigan at Ann Arbor in 1883, was admitted to the bar the same year, and commenced practice in Westerville, Ohio.

He was editor and proprietor of the Westerville Review in 1884, of the Adrian, Michigan Daily Record 1884–1886, and of the Ann Arbor Argus 1886–1905.

He was also mayor of Ann Arbor 1888–1890, postmaster of Ann Arbor 1894–1898, city treasurer 1891-1893 and 1903–1905, and city assessor 1906–1913. He was a delegate to the Democratic National Convention at St. Louis in 1916.

Beakes was elected as a Democrat from Michigan's 2nd District to the United States House of Representatives for the Sixty-third and Sixty-fourth Congresses, serving from March 4, 1913 to March 3, 1917.  

He successfully contested the election of Mark R. Bacon to the Sixty-fifth Congress and served from December 13, 1917, to March 3, 1919. He was defeated by Earl C. Michener for reelection in 1918 to the Sixty-sixth Congress.

After his service in Congress, he resided in Washington, D.C. and was assistant chief of the industrial cooperation service of the United States Department of Commerce from April to July 1919 and a staff member of the United States Veterans' Bureau from 1919 until his death in Washington, D.C., aged 66.

He is buried in Forest Hill Cemetery in Ann Arbor, Michigan.

Further reading
Mayors of Ann Arbor page at PoliticalGraveyard.com
 Past and Present of Washtenaw County, Michigan by Samuel Willard Beakes on Internet Archive

1861 births
1927 deaths
American publishers (people)
Burials in Michigan
Democratic Party members of the United States House of Representatives from Michigan
Mayors of Ann Arbor, Michigan
Ohio lawyers
University of Michigan Law School alumni
City and town treasurers in the United States
19th-century American politicians
20th-century American politicians
19th-century American lawyers
Michigan postmasters